Tsar, or tzar, csar, or czar, is a title used for monarchs or supreme rulers of Eastern Europe and Russia.

Tsar, tzar, csar, or czar may also refer to:

 Czar (political term), an informal title used for certain high-level officials in the US and UK

Arts and entertainment 
 Tsar (film), a 2009 Russian film
 Tsar (band), an American rock band 
 The Czars, an American rock band 
 "Czar", a song by Frank Black from the 1994  album Frank Black
 Tzar: The Burden of the Crown, a 2000 computer game

Places 
 Czar, Missouri, U.S.
 Czar, West Virginia, U.S.
 Czar, Alberta, Canada
 Zar, Azerbaijan, or Tsar (Ծար)

Other uses
 Tsar Bomba, a Soviet nuclear weapon
 TSAR Publications, a Canadian publisher
 Tsar Tank, a Russian armoured vehicle 1914–1915
 Camellia japonica 'The Czar', a camellia cultivar
 Vladimir Kononov (Donetsk People's Republic), nom de guerre Tsar, a Donetsk militia leader
 The Czar of The Style Invitational, a judge of the humor contest

See also 
 
 
 
 
 Kaiser (disambiguation)
 Keizer (disambiguation)
 Zhar (disambiguation)